Royal Air Force Ossington or more simply RAF Ossington is a former Royal Air Force  station located near the village of Ossington, Nottinghamshire, England.

History
Construction of the airfield began in 1941, with the aim of completion by 1942. It was constructed as standard A-shaped bomber airfield with 3 hard runways, the longest of the 3 being just over 1.5 km long. After completion, the airfield was put under Number 5 Group, RAF Bomber Command.

In January 1942, the airfield became an RAF Flying Training Command station flying Airspeed Oxfords. May 1942 saw the Number 14 AFU move to Banff, Scotland.

After this period, the airfield returned to the control of Bomber Command, Number 93 Group and became a satellite station of RAF Gamston. On 1 June 1943 No. 82 OTU formed using Vickers Wellingtons as was standard at the time, along with 5 Miles Martinets as target tugs for gunner training.

On 9 August 1943, a crew from RAF Ossington was lost after the starboard engine of their Vickers Wellington Mk.X (MS471) during a cross-country training exercise. On 21 August 1943, Vickers Wellington Mk.X (HE332) collided with trees on its landing approach after another cross-country training exercise. Again, later in the year, the crew of Vickers Wellington Mk.III (BK387) encountered low fog and hit high ground at Tewitt Hall Wood. On 22 May 1944 a midair collision occurred between Vickers Wellington Mk.III (BJ819) and Supermarine Spitfire Mk.I (P7820). The pilot of the Spitfire, Flying Officer John Smith, aged 21, from Embasy, North Yorkshire, was killed when his aircraft crashed in Lea Road, Gainsborough. Witnesses quoted in the Lincolnshire Echo said he stayed with the aircraft to avoid nearby houses. A married man, he was attached to 53 OTU, RAF Kirton-in-Lindsey, Lincolnshire. The Wellington pilot, Flying Officer JP Lee, received a commendation for bravery for saving his crew. The collision happened during a cine-gun training exercise involving the Spitfire intercepting the Wellington.

In June 1944, the OTU was joined at RAF Ossington by Number 1685 Training Flight with Curtiss Tomahawks where they stayed briefly. No. 82 OTU stayed until January 1945, when they were disbanded.

Like many stations, RAF Ossington was transferred to RAF Transport Command where pilots were trained to fly Avro Lancasters and Avro Lancastrians on the London to New Zealand route.

Eventually, the runways were broken up for the construction of the A1 (though some taxiways and buildings have survived).

The following units were here at some point:
 No. 6 Lancaster Finishing School RAF
 No. 14 (Pilots) Advanced Flying Unit RAF
 No. 14 Service Flying Training School RAF
 No. 28 Operational Training Unit RAF
 No. 82 OTU
 No. 1384 (Heavy Transport) Conversion Unit RAF 
 No. 1685 (Bomber) Defence Training Flight RAF
 No. 2840 Squadron RAF Regiment
 Squadron & Flight Commanders School RAF
 Transport Command Night Vision Instructors Training School RAF

Gallery

References

External links

 http://www.airfieldarchaeology.co.uk/raf-ossington.html

Royal Air Force stations in Nottinghamshire
1942 establishments in England
1946 disestablishments in England